The LV Legislature of the Congress of the Union met from September 1, 1991, to August 31, 1994.

32 senators and all of the deputies had been elected in the 1991 legislative elections. The deputies served three years and the senators six, continuing into the LVI Legislature of the Mexican Congress.

The PRI regained near-total control of the legislature, with nearly two-thirds of the deputies and all but three senators.

Legislation

Constitutional Reforms

New Laws

Senate

By political party

By federative entity

Parliamentary coordinators 
  Partido Acción Nacional
 Héctor Terán Terán
   Partido Revolucionario Institucional: 
 Netzahualcóyotl de la Vega
  Partido de la Revolución Democrática: 
 Porfirio Muñoz Ledo

Chamber of Deputies 
The Chamber of Deputies had 500 legislators, elected for three-year terms with no immediate reelection. 300 deputies were elected from single-member districts and the other 200 from party lists in each of the five proportional representation electoral regions.

Deputies by political party

Deputies from single-member districts

Proportional representation deputies

Presidents of the Head Commission of the Chamber of Deputies 
 (1991 - 1993): Fernando Ortiz Arana 
 (1993 - 1994): María de los Ángeles Moreno

Parliamentary coordinators 
  Partido Acción Nacional:
 (1991 - 1993): Diego Fernández de Cevallos
 (1993 - 1994): Gabriel Jiménez Remus
  Partido Revolucionario Institucional :

  Partido de la Revolución Democrática:

Sources
Mexican Chamber of Deputies

Congress of Mexico by session